Soh Hang-suen (10 October 1951 – 12 June 2013), (alternatively romanised as So Hung-shuen), was a Hong Kong actress. Soh worked for TVB during its Golden Age, joining in 1974, and was most notable for her role in Looking Back in Anger. Soh ran her own vegetarian restaurant in Tsim Sha Tsui. She died on 12 June 2013, after complications arising from a stroke.

Filmography

References

External links
 
 

1951 births
2013 deaths
Hong Kong Buddhists
Hong Kong film actresses
Hong Kong television actresses
TVB veteran actors
20th-century Hong Kong actresses
21st-century Hong Kong actresses